WSJM-FM is a radio station broadcasting a News/Talk format. Licensed to Benton Harbor, Michigan, the station formerly simulcasted with WSJM except for Fox Sports Radio programming on AM and for most weekend programs.  The simulcast ended in late August 2014 when WSJM switched to all-sports; WSJM-FM's News/Talk format continued  as before.

History

The WSJM-FM callsign was originally assigned to 107.1 MHz in 1964 as a classical music outlet to sister station WSJM (which, at the time, had a "top-forty" rock-and-roll format) and owned by Mid-West Family Broadcasting (MWF), which is based in Madison, Wisconsin. The callsign was changed to WIRX in 1979 and became dormant until 2008.  The station is still managed on a local level to this day, much as it was when it first began broadcasting.

It is thought that WSJM-FM was one of the world's first completely automated radio stations, built and designed by Brian Brown in 1963 when Brown was only 10 years old.  The station broadcast in a classical format, called "More Good Music (MGM)" and five-minute bottom-of-the-hour news feeds from the Mutual Broadcasting System.  The heart of the automation was an 8 x 24 telephone stepping relay which controlled two reel-to-reel tape decks, one twelve inch Ampex machine which provided the main program audio and a second RCA seven inch machine which provided "fill" music.  The tapes that these machines played were originally produced in the MWF's Madison, Wisconsin production facility by WSJM Chief Engineer Richard E. McLemore (and later in-house at WSJM) with special sub-audible cue tones used to signal the end of a song.  The stepping relay was "programmed" by slide switches in the front of the two relay racks which housed the equipment.  The news feeds were triggered by a microswitch which was attached to a Western Union clock and tripped by the minute hand of the clock. and then reset the stepping relay.  Originally, 20-minute station identification was accomplished by a simulcast switch in the control booth for sister station WSJM, whereupon the disc jockey in the booth would announce "This is WSJM AM and... (then pressing the momentary contact button) ...WSJM-FM, St. Joseph, Michigan."  This only lasted about six months, however, and a standard tape cartridge player was wired in to announce the station identification and triggered by the Western Union clock.

The station callsigns had previously been WCNF "The Coast" until the station was moved to the 98.3 FM frequency (with new calls WCXT) on January 24, 2008 in a 3 station swap that started on January 7. The WCSY call letters as well as the "Cosy FM" name, which had been on the 98.3 FM frequency, were moved the 103.7 FM frequency. The WHIT-FM call letters  were dropped from 103.7 FM, but the oldies format and "SuperHits" branding were retained.

94.9 FM first began broadcasting in 1998 as WYKL with an oldies format.  Following competitor WHFB-FM's format change from Hot AC to country, 94.9 FM changed to a Hot AC format that lasted until the recent change.

Mid-West Family Broadcasting owns all three stations involved in the format swap.

References

Michiguide.com - WSJM-FM History

External links

SJM-FM
News and talk radio stations in the United States
Radio stations established in 1998
Benton Harbor, Michigan